John Paterson (often spelled Patterson) (1744 – July 19, 1808) was a major general in the Continental Army during the American Revolution, and a U.S. Congressman from New York.

Early life
Paterson was born in 1744 in either Farmington or New Britain in the Connecticut Colony.  His mother was Ruth (Bird) Paterson, and his father Colonel John Paterson (1708–1762), was a militia veteran of the French and Indian War, who died during the Siege of Havana.  He graduated from Yale College in 1762, studied law, attained admission to the bar, and practiced in New Britain.  He was a justice of the peace in New Britain until 1774, when he moved to Lenox, Massachusetts.  Paterson was elected to the Lenox board of selectmen and as a town assessor.  The town's proprietor's also chose him to serve as their clerk, which required him to maintain records of land transactions and ownership.  He was elected to represent Lenox in the Massachusetts House of Representatives in both 1774 and 1775.  He also represented Lenox at the 1774 Berkshire Convention, held in Stockbridge, Massachusetts to discuss how to respond to the Boston Port Act.  When the governor dissolved the legislature as pre-revolution tensions continued to rise, the people of Massachusetts formed a provincial Congress.  Paterson was elected as Lenox's representative in both 1774 and 1775.

American Revolution

When the American Revolution began in April 1775 Paterson was commissioned as a colonel by the Massachusetts Committee of Safety, and he marched with his militia unit to take part in the Siege of Boston.  Paterson's command, the 1st Massachusetts Regiment saw action at the Battle of Bunker Hill.  After the British evacuation of Boston, Paterson's regiment took part in the Invasion of Canada and the battles of Trenton and Princeton in New Jersey.  On February 21, 1777 Paterson was promoted to brigadier general in the Continental Army.

During the Saratoga Campaign of 1777 Paterson commanded a brigade of Horatio Gates' army, consisting of the 10th, 11th, 12th, and 14th Massachusetts Regiments, and the 1st Berkshire County Militia Regiment.

Paterson served under George Washington at the Battle of Monmouth in 1778.  He served primarily in the Hudson Valley of New York until the end of the war.  In September 1783, he received promotion to major general, and he was discharged in December 1783.  Paterson was one of the last generals to leave active duty at the end of the war.

While Paterson served in New York in 1782 and 1783, his personal staff included Private Robert Shirtliff of the 4th Massachusetts Regiment, who served as a waiter.  Shirtliff (also spelled Shirtliffe or Shurtleff) was later revealed to be Deborah Sampson, a woman who had disguised herself as a man in order to join the Continental Army.  Rather than reprimand her, as had often been the case with women discovered in the ranks, Paterson provided her with a certificate of honorable discharge, a note with words of encouragement, and money sufficient to pay for travel to her home in Massachusetts.

In January 1783, Paterson took part in the organizational meeting that created the Society of the Cincinnati, and he was one of the society's charter members.

Return to Massachusetts
After the war Paterson returned to Massachusetts, where he resumed practicing law, and also served in local offices including town meeting moderator, selectman, fence viewer, tax assessor, and highway surveyor.  In addition, he was the leader of the successful movement to locate the Berkshire County seat in Lenox.  (It was moved to Pittsfield in 1860.)  In 1785, he was again elected to represent Lenox in the state House of Representatives.  In 1786, he was commissioned as a major general in the Massachusetts Militia, and assigned to command the militia's 9th Division.  In 1786 and 1787, Paterson commanded militia units that took part in the quelling of Shays's Rebellion.

Move to New York

In 1790, Paterson was one of the investors in the Boston Patent, a large land grant in Broome and Tioga Counties, New York.  In 1791, he moved to Lisle, a newly-organized town in Tioga County.  He was a member of the New York State Assembly in 1793.  The area of Lisle where Paterson settled was later organized as the town of Triangle; the site of his home and farm was in what is now the village of Whitney Point.

In 1798, Paterson was appointed judge of the Tioga County Court, and he served until 1806.  When Broome County was organized separately from Tioga in 1806, Paterson was appointed judge of the new county's court.

In the late 1700s and early 1800s, Deborah Sampson published a memoir and made a lecture tour in which she gave presentations about her military service.  Her tour took her to New York, and from November to December 1802, she visited Paterson in Lisle.  While she stayed with Paterson, Sampson was able to take part in reunions with other former Massachusetts soldiers who had settled in the area of the Boston Patent.

In 1802, Paterson was a successful Democratic-Republican candidate for the United States House of Representatives.  He served in the 8th United States Congress (March 4, 1803 – March 3, 1805), and was not a candidate for reelection in 1804.

Death and burial
Paterson died in Lisle on July 19, 1808.  He was originally interred at Riverside Cemetery in Whitney Point.  In 1892 he was reburied at Church on the Hill Cemetery in Lenox, Massachusetts.

Family
In 1766, Paterson married Elizabeth Lee.  They were the parents of seven children, including:
 Josiah Lee (1766–1846), who married Clarissa Hyde
 Hannah (1769–1803), the wife of Azariah Egleston
 Polly (1773–1790)
 Ruth (1774–1842), the wife of Ira Seymour
 Betsey (1784–1784)
 John Pierce (1787–1842), who married Sally Osborn
 Mariah (1790–1865), the wife of Samuel Kilborn

Congressman Thomas J. Paterson (1805–1885) and State Senator John E. Paterson (born 1800) were Paterson's grandsons.  Scientist and academic Thomas Egleston was his great-grandson.

References

Sources

Books

Magazines

Newspapers

External links

 John Paterson at Virtual American Biographies
 
 

1744 births
1808 deaths
Yale College alumni
American militia generals
Continental Army generals
Continental Army officers from Massachusetts
Members of the Massachusetts House of Representatives
Connecticut lawyers
Massachusetts lawyers
New York (state) lawyers
Members of the New York State Assembly
Democratic-Republican Party members of the United States House of Representatives from New York (state)
New York (state) state court judges
Politicians from New Britain, Connecticut
People from Lenox, Massachusetts
People from Lisle, New York
Burials in Massachusetts